Karnataka Sangeeta Nritya Academy is a performing arts organization in Bengaluru, India that is sponsored by the Department of Kannada and Culture in the Karnataka government. It was previously known as Karnataka Sangeetha Nataka Akademi.

The academy promotes dance, drama and music within the culture of Karnataka.  It was opened on 26 April 1958, inaugurated by  Indian Prime Minister Pandit Jawaharlal Nehru.

The academy collaborates with the Sangeet Natak Academy in New Delhi.

Activities 
the Ravindra Kalashetra theatre in Bengaluru city is the Academy's performance venue. Academy confers the Karnataka Kalashri Award.

Each year the Academy give awards for excellence in performance of music, art, dance and literaturei. The award carries citation, trophy, shawl. The honorary awards carry a cash prize of Rs.50,000 and Annual Awards carry a cash prize of Rs.25,000.

References

External links
Karnataka Sangeeta Nritya Academy

Organisations based in Bangalore
1958 establishments in Mysore State
Government of Karnataka